Washburn High School is a four-year public high school serving grades 9–12 in the Tangletown neighborhood of Minneapolis, Minnesota, United States. By enrollment, Washburn is the second-largest high school in Minneapolis Public Schools.

History 
Washburn High School was built in 1925 to meet the demands of the growing South Minneapolis neighborhood. Construction for the new three-story building began in 1924 after the Minneapolis Board of Education purchased unused land in Washburn Park. Land next to the school was occupied by the Washburn Memorial Orphan Asylum, now torn down and replaced with Justice Page Middle School (formerly Ramsey Middle School). Washburn is in southern Minneapolis's Tangletown neighborhood, at 201 West 49th Street.

Washburn opened on September 8, 1925, to 1,031 students. When it opened, it served grades 7–10 and added one year each year for the next two years. It served middle school and high school students until 1929. It became very popular, and by 1931, 2,370 students attended the school built for 1,500. The school has been expanded several times to meet the high enrollment.

The school is conventionally named after Cadwallader C. Washburn. When the school was presented to the school board it was called William D. Washburn High School, in reference to Cadwallader's brother, but naming the school after William is thought to be an error. The school has been heavily influenced by Minneapolis's milling empire. Its newspaper, The Grist, involves milling terminology; the school's colors, blue and orange, were those of Gold Medal Flour, a company partly run by the Washburn family and a predecessor to General Mills; and the athletic teams' nickname is the Millers.

Campus 

Washburn is on a 4½-city block parcel bordered by West 49th and 50th streets on the north and south and Nicollet Ave. S. and Pleasant Ave. S on the east and west. Justice Page Middle School shares this parcel of land, with Washburn taking 2/3 of the space. In between the schools is A. E. MacQuarrie Field, which hosts football, soccer, lacrosse, and track and field competitions. In addition, the area between the school and field is a green space known as The Mall. Youth soccer teams, specifically the Fuller Soccer program from a neighboring park, use The Mall for games on weekends.

A tunnel under MacQuarrie Field connects the east side of Washburn and the west side of Page. It transports heating and air conditioning between the schools. During the winter, snow melts directly above the tunnel due to the steam pipes within showing the tunnel's location. Decades ago, students used the tunnel during the winter when overcrowding forced Washburn to hold classes in Ramsey.

Demographics
The demographic breakdown of the 1,960 students enrolled in 2021-22 was:
Male – 53%
Female – 47%
Native American/Alaskan – 0.9%
Asian/Pacific islanders – 3.5%
Black – 20.5%
Hispanic – 14.7%
White – 58.1%
Multiracial – 2.3%

31% of the students were eligible for free or reduced cost lunch. This is a Title I school.

Staff 
Emily Lilja Palmer, formerly of Sanford Middle School, was named the principal on July 2, 2018.

During the 2020–21 school year, Washburn employed 139 staff members, of whom 81 were teachers. The student to teacher ratio was 20:1, with an October 1 student count of 1,689.

Past principals

Curriculum

College-credit opportunities 
Washburn has an International Baccalaureate Diploma Programme (IBDP) for juniors and seniors. It also offers Advanced Placement (AP) and Career and Technical Education (CTE) classes for 9th- through 12th-grade students to earn college credit free of charge. It uses schoolwide advisory programs to form relationships for each student. In addition, Washburn students can apply for and enroll in PSEO classes at the University of Minnesota, Minneapolis Community and Technical College, Concordia University, Normandale Community College, Dunwoody College of Technology, and North Central University.

Bilingual support

Washburn offers bilingual support for students and families in Spanish and Somali, and English as a Second Language (ESL) support is also available.

World languages and fine arts

Washburn offers four world languages: Arabic, American Sign Language (ASL), French, and Spanish. The school also offers jazz band, concert band, orchestra, concert choir, and pop choir, as well as its varsity choir, Miller Voices.

Extracurricular activities 
In line with Washburn's three pillars of academics, arts and athletics, there are many opportunities in these areas in and beyond the classroom.

Athletics

Washburn is a member of the Minnesota State High School League and offers Boys and Girls varsity level sports, including:

 Boys' athletics
 Baseball
 Basketball
 Cross country running
 Cross country skiing
 Football
 Golf
 Hockey (Citywide team)
 Lacrosse (Citywide team)
 Soccer
 Swimming
 Tennis
 Track and field
 Wrestling
 Girls' athletics
 Badminton
 Basketball
 Cross country running
 Cross country skiing
 Golf
 Gymnastics
 Hockey (Citywide team)
 Lacrosse (Citywide team)
 Soccer
 Softball
 Swimming
 Tennis
 Track and field
 Volleyball
 Wrestling

Theater
Washburn offers Blackbox theater classes, which give performances of student-created works, and after-school productions that are open to all students. Washburn productions typically include a musical in the fall, a larger Spotlight production in the winter, and a straight play or musical in the spring. Washburn also participates in the MSHSL One-Act Play competition.

Clubs
Washburn students have a variety of opportunities to participate in extracurricular activities, which take place before and after school. Notable organizations include Model UN, ACE (Architecture-Construction-Engineering), Amnesty International, Art Club, Book Club, College Club, Community Service Club, Dare 2 Be Real, Debate, Feminism Club, Green Team, The Grist newspaper, GSA, Knitting Club, Math Team, Mountain Biking Team, National Honor Society (NHS), Native Club, the Odyssey magazine, Otaku Club, Philosophy Club, FIRST Robotics Team, Marine Scuba Club, Silver Ribbon Club, Student Council, Teen Council, TRiO Educational Talent Search, and Urban Farm.

Fresh start 

In March 2008, the Minneapolis Board of Education announced that Washburn would be one of two high schools in the Minneapolis Public Schools Fresh Start program. Along with Edison High School, Washburn hired new teachers and staff and examined its curriculum. These changes were part of a nine-point plan by the Minneapolis school board to alleviate budget problems and prepare 80% of graduates for college. Principal Carol Markham-Cousins returned to lead the school, with the rest of the teaching staff required to apply for rehire or as new to the building.

On May 14, 2008, Markham-Cousins sent letters to students and family members explaining the reasons for the Fresh Start. She cited graduation rates and college preparation as two reasons. The same day, students staged a walk-out in protest of the program. Student drew with chalk on the sidewalk in front of the school in support of the teachers.

Additional changes that came to Washburn in 2008-09 included an increase in the number of art classes and the introduction of the International Baccalaureate program.

Notable alumni 
 Arlene Dahl — Class of 1943, film and television actress, former MGM contract star who achieved notability during the 1950s; mother of actor Lorenzo Lamas
 Russ Anderson — Class of 1973, hockey star at University of Minnesota and in NHL; married Miss America 1977 Dorothy Benham
 James Arness — Class of 1942, film and television actor most famous for portraying Marshal Matt Dillon on long-running TV series Gunsmoke
 Patty Berg — golfer, founding member of LPGA, inductee in World Golf Hall of Fame
 Bob Cabana - Class of 1967, astronaut, 2008 Astronaut Hall of Fame inductee
 Richard Carlson - Class of 1929, film and television actor with star on Hollywood Walk of Fame
 Sean Daley — best known as Slug, member of hip-hop duo Atmosphere.
 Ryan Hoag – football player drafted by Oakland Raiders in 2003 (currently the Boys' Varsity Tennis coach at Washburn)
 Ralph Lemon — artist
 Terry Lewis — musician 
 Dave Moore — newscaster
 Michele Norris —  Class of 1979, National Public Radio host
 R. L. Huggar —  best known as R.L., frontman of Next
 Jimmy Jam — musician
 Kathryn Finney — best-selling author, NBC Today Show correspondent, social media pioneer.
 Jeanne Phillips — columnist, Dear Abby
 Ra'Shede Hageman - Class of 2009, NFL player, Atlanta Falcons
 Garrett Bender - Class of 2009, United States national rugby union team
 John B. Keefe - Minnesota state legislator, lawyer, and judge.

References

External links
 Official website

High schools in Minneapolis
Educational institutions established in 1925
Minneapolis Public Schools
Public high schools in Minnesota
International Baccalaureate schools in Minnesota